Austrogautieria is a genus of truffle-like fungi in the family Gallaceaceae. Segregated from the genus Gautieria in 1986, the genus contains six species found in Australia.

References

External links

Hysterangiales
Fungi of Australia
Agaricomycetes genera
Taxa named by James Trappe